Morgan Edge is a fictional character appearing in American comic books published by DC Comics. Originally a supporting character, he is a media mogul who acquires The Daily Planet and employs Clark Kent as a television journalist for his WGBS TV network. After the Crisis on Infinite Earth series which led to a revision of the DC Universe, the character was changed to a Superman villain and one of the known leaders of Intergang.

Adrian Pasdar portrayed Morgan Edge in the Arrowverse series Supergirl. In Superman & Lois, Adam Rayner played a version of the character who is also Superman's Kryptonian half-brother named Tal-Rho.

Publication history
Morgan Edge first appeared in Superman's Pal, Jimmy Olsen #133 and was created by Jack Kirby. Kirby based his physical appearance on actor Kevin McCarthy, while his personality was inspired by television executive James T. Aubrey. According to Kirby's production assistant Mark Evanier, Kirby "wanted to explore the theme of organized crime gaining a foothold in corporate America - particularly a giant media conglomerate. Given the shady background of the company that acquired Warner Bros. and DC, it was something of an inside joke". However, under prodding from editorial staff who preferred Edge to be an ongoing supporting character rather than a villain who would ultimately have to be brought to justice (and thus written out of the series), the "Morgan Edge" connected to Intergang was revealed to be an imposter.

Fictional character biography

Pre-Crisis
In his original incarnation, Edge was the president of the Galaxy Broadcasting System (owners of television station WGBS), the media corporation which eventually bought the Daily Planet. Edge was in many ways a stereotype of a ruthless capitalist, intervening in the Planets homey atmosphere and challenging the authority of the somewhat older Perry White, but he was a decent man who had moments of good-heartedness and maintained reasonably friendly relationships with most of his employees, including Clark Kent. Following the takeover of the Planet, Edge transferred Kent to the news division, making him a traveling correspondent and later anchorman on WGBS. This move added several TV co-workers to the Superman supporting cast, including fretful producer Josh Coyle, sports broadcaster Steve Lombard, weather forecaster Oscar Asherman, and co-anchor Lana Lang (who had been one of Clark's childhood friends in Smallville).

As one of the wealthiest men in Metropolis, Edge was a major political figure in the city and frequently encountered Superman, the subject of many of his network's news stories, whom he, like most others, failed to realize was also Clark Kent. Although rarely integral to a plotline, Edge was a supporting character in many Superman stories.

For a while it appeared that Edge was connected to the Apokolips-sponsored crime organisation Intergang, but this was revealed to be a clone created by the 'Evil Factory', a genetics laboratory working for Darkseid. For example, this clone attempted to have Jimmy Olsen, the Guardian and, incidentally, a random Daily Planet employee named Goody Rickels, a Don Rickles lookalike, murdered as part of a cover-up.

It was later revealed that Morgan Edge's birth name was Morris Edelstein. After he won his first TV station in a game of poker, Morris Edelstein changed his name to Morgan Edge because he was ashamed of his lower-class Jewish background and kept the details of his past closely guarded.

Post-Crisis
When DC continuity was rebooted after the Crisis on Infinite Earths, Edge remained president of WGBS, but his ties to the Planet and friendship with Superman were retconned away, and he was genuinely connected to Intergang. He was eventually exposed by the Daily Planet, in articles by Clark Kent and Cat Grant, who was working for WGBS undercover. Edge was imprisoned, but even managed to cause trouble there by publishing his autobiography On the Edge, which dumped upon his father Vincent Edge as well as Cat Grant, revealing that she slept her way into a scoop. After his release from jail, Morgan Edge returned as sponsor of the Superman Revenge Squad. Prior to his imprisonment, one of his actions generated much fan anger, in which Edge sadistically and gleefully ran over a raccoon on the road, prompting one fan to write in saying "Lex Luthor treats people like animals, but even he does not run them over intentionally".

Recently, Morgan Edge has resurfaced as a powerful media pundit, with the show Edge of Reason, where he gives off anti-Kryptonian spin for General Lane. He is also seen in a "flash-forward" panel in Adventure Comics (vol. 2) #1, making a mysterious deal with Despero.

The New 52
In 2011, "The New 52" rebooted the DC universe. Morgan Edge appears as a powerful and self-centered media mogul and the new owner of the Daily Planet, he is seen as the sponsor of the Challengers of the Unknown program before they all leave due to his ruthless business strategy. This version of Morgan Edge is depicted as a bald African American man with a goatee. Although a tough businessman, Edge did recognize talent, and awarded Lois Lane the editorship of the Daily Planet.

Edge's multiple media holdings become a benefit to Superman as Lois Lane, now director of Edge's Metropolis news station, has said building's security cameras "hacked" to provide vital intelligence on a rampaging villain.

Prior to DC Rebirth, in the last issue of the 2011 Justice League series, it is mentioned that Lex Luthor had bought the Daily Planet from him.

In other media
 A character inspired by Morgan Edge named Bill Church, Jr. appears in Lois & Clark: The New Adventures of Superman, portrayed by Bruce Campbell. Similarly to Edge, Church Jr. owns a TV station called "Multiworld Communications". Additionally, he has a father named Bill Church, Sr. (portrayed by Peter Boyle).
 Morgan Edge appears in Smallville, portrayed by Rutger Hauer (original likeness) and by Patrick Bergin (surgically-altered likeness). This version is a Metropolis crime lord and an old friend of Lionel Luthor, who he grew up with in Suicide Slum. After learning Clark Kent stole money from one of Edge's gangs while under the influence of Red Kryptonite, Edge recruits Clark to steal a package, which the latter later discovers is his own blood sample, from Lionel's LuthorCorp office. When Jonathan Kent destroys the sample, Edge takes him and Martha Kent hostage in retaliation. Clark procures a new sample from himself and gives it to Edge, who in turn gives it to Lionel, promising to give him the source. Edge's thugs kidnap Clark and attempt to bring him to Metropolis, but the latter escapes. Lionel, believing he was betrayed, orders his security to kill Edge, who is presumed dead, but secretly found by Lex Luthor. Now in hiding, Edge undergoes plastic surgery, but later conspires with Lionel to break Lex's psyche. While attempting to kill Lex, Edge is killed.
 Morgan Edge appears in the Justice League episode "Secret Society" Pt. 1, voiced by an uncredited Brian George. This version is a collector of unique oddities and displays no moral qualms against collecting sentient beings.
 Morgan Edge appears in the third season of Supergirl, portrayed by Adrian Pasdar. This version is an amoral real estate developer who runs Edge Global.
 Morgan Edge appears in Superman & Lois, portrayed by Adam Rayner. This version is a Kryptonian named Tal-Rho, the son of Lara Lor-Van and Zeta-Rho (portrayed by A.C. Peterson) and the maternal half-brother of Superman. Like Superman, Tal-Rho was also sent off of Krypton in an escape pod, which landed in England, where he immediately came into conflict with the local townspeople. He was captured and experimented on, but later managed to escape, causing him to hate mankind. In the intervening years, he developed the identity of "Morgan Edge", an intelligent, eloquent, and impassioned self-made mogul and the head of EnerCorp and Galaxy Holdings, as well as a plot to resurrect Krypton on Earth by implanting Kryptonian consciousnesses into human hosts using X-Kryptonite and the Eradicator, only to be defeated by Superman and John Henry Irons and remanded to a cell with red solar lighting.
 A Bizarro version of Tal-Rho appears in the episode "Bizarros in a Bizarro World", also portrayed by Rayner. He is married to his version of Lana Lang and is on good terms with Bizarro. The Bizarro Tal-Rho is later killed by Ally Allston.

See also
 List of Superman enemies

References

External links
 Superman Homepage: Morgan Edge
 DCU Guide: Morgan Edge Pre-Crisis chronology
 DCU Guide: Morgan Edge Clone Pre-Crisis chronology
 DCU Guide: Morgan Edge Post-Crisis chronology

DC Comics male supervillains
Fictional businesspeople
Comics characters introduced in 1970
Fictional gangsters
Characters created by Jack Kirby
Clone characters in comics
Superman characters
Fictional American Jews

de:Nebenfiguren im Superman-Universum#Morgan Edge